This is the discography of British singer David Whitfield.

Albums

Studio albums

Live albums

Compilation albums

EPs

Singles

Notes

References

Discographies of British artists
Pop music discographies